The master of the treasury or treasurer ( or , , ,  or) was a royal official in the Kingdom of Hungary from the 12th century. Although treasurers were initially responsible for collecting and administering royal revenues, they adopted more and more judiciary functions and turned into the highest judges of the realm. From the 14th century, treasurers presided over the court of appeals for a group of the free royal cities, including Buda, Bártfa, Eperjes, Kassa, Nagyszombat and Pressburg (Pozsony) (today Bardejov, Prešov, Košice, Trnava and Bratislava in Slovakia).

The name is derived from the Slavic word tovor ("casket", "strong-box").

Middle Ages
Initially, the treasurer (taverník) was the administrator of the royal treasury (i.e. the financial manager of the royal Court (curia regis)) in the early Hungarian state. In the 12th and 13th century, besides the curia regis, he became also responsible for the remaining properties of the king. When the royal properties were considerably reduced under King Andrew II of Hungary (1205-1235; see Comitatus (Kingdom of Hungary) for details), the treasurer also became responsible for all royal income from royal régales (coinage, exchange of coins, precious metals management, mining monopoly, salt monopoly, customs duty), from the taxes of royal towns etc.

Under King Charles Robert (1308–1342) he became a kind of combined finance minister and minister of economy. In 1385, the actual treasurer function, i.e. administrator of the royal treasury, became the responsibility of a separate person, who was the treasurer (magister tavernicorum)'s deputy first, and later a separate royal officer.

The observance of rights and duties of royal towns was also the responsibility of the treasurer. Since the importance of these towns increased in the 14th and 15th century, the treasurer's importance increased as well. He became also the judge charged with appeals from major free royal towns (tavernical courts). Around 1400, the list of these towns was not stabilized yet, but from the first half of the 15th century, these towns stabilised  (Buda, Kassa (Košice), Pressburg (Pozsony, Bratislava), Nagyszombat (Trnava), Eperjes (Prešov), Sopron and Bártfa (Bardejov)) and were called "tavernical towns". In the course of the 15th century, these tavernical courts became the only courts of the tavernical towns. By the late 15th century, the associate judges of these courts were representatives of the tavernical towns only (and no additional nobles as was the case earlier). The law applied in these courts was a special "tavernical law" (ius tavernicale), the first collection of which arose in 1412-18 (Vetusta iura civitatum sive iura civilia). It was used as special law system until the 18th century.

The treasurer was also a member of the Royal Chamber and later also of the Vice-regency council (see palatine).

Modern times
After the creation of the Hungarian Chamber (the supreme financial and economic authority of the Kingdom of Hungary between 1528 and 1848), the influence of the treasurer further decreased, because this authority took over many of his tasks.

The function (including the tavernical courts) was abolished de facto in 1848; the treasurer's function, however, continued to exist formally till 1918 as the fourth highest royal dignitary, who was member of the Upper Chamber of the parliament of the Kingdom of Hungary and played a certain role in the coronation of the king.

See also
 Palatine (Kingdom of Hungary)
 Judge royal

Footnotes

References

  Engel, Pál (1996). Magyarország világi archontológiája, 1301–1457, I. ("Secular Archontology of Hungary, 1301–1457, Volume I"). História, MTA Történettudományi Intézete. Budapest. .
 Engel, Pál (2001). The Realm of St Stephen: A History of Medieval Hungary, 895-1526. I.B. Tauris Publishers. .
  Fallenbüchl, Zoltán (1988). Magyarország főméltóságai ("High Dignitaries in Hungary"). Maecenas Könyvkiadó. .
  Jugoslavenski leksikografski zavod (Yugoslav Lexicographical Institute) (1969). Enciklopedija Leksikografskog zavoda II. izdanje, svezak 6: SKA-ŽV, Zagreb 1969., str. 336 (General Encyclopedia of the Yugoslav Lexicographical Institute, second edition, sixth volume SKA-ŽV) 
 Rady, Martyn (2000). Nobility, Land and Service in Medieval Hungary. Palgrave (in association with School of Slavonic and East European Studies, University College London). .
 Segeš, Vladimír (2002). Entry Taverník (treasurer) in: Škvarna, Dušan; Bartl, Július; Čičaj, Viliam; Kohútová, Mária; Letz, Róbert; Segeš, Vladimír; Slovak History: Chronology & Lexicon; Bolchazy-Carducci Publishers. Wauconda (Illinois); .
 Stephen Werbőczy: The Customary Law of the Renowned Kingdom of Hungary in Three Parts (1517) (Edited and translated by János M. Bak, Péter Banyó and Martyn Rady with an introductory study by László Péter) (2005). Charles Schlacks, Jr. Publishers. .
  Zsoldos, Attila (2011). Magyarország világi archontológiája, 1000–1301 ("Secular Archontology of Hungary, 1000–1301"). História, MTA Történettudományi Intézete. Budapest. .

Barons of the realm (Kingdom of Hungary)
Hungary
Historical management occupations
Historical economic occupations